The Pirate Party UK (often abbreviated PPUK; in ) was a political party in the United Kingdom. The Pirate Party's core policies were to bring about reform to copyright and patent laws, support privacy, reduce surveillance from government and businesses, and support freedom of speech and freedom of expression.

The party was established in July 2009. The first leader of the party was Andrew Robinson, who stepped down in August 2010. Laurence "Loz" Kaye was elected to replace him in September 2010, and served until after the 2015 general election, when he stepped down. Following Kaye's resignation, a leadership election was held, with Cris Chesha being elected leader and David A Elston being elected the party's first deputy leader. The party announced that it had voted to dissolve on 7 October 2020, and was de-registered as a political party by the Electoral Commission on 9 November 2020.

History
Following The Pirate Bay trial, a large surge in Pirate Party interest occurred around the world. After the success of the Swedish Pirate Party in the summer 2009 European elections, there was a sudden growth of Pirate Party organisations across Europe (notably in Germany and France) and beyond. Forum membership soared. The official formation of the Pirate Party in the UK followed shortly after the European elections and the Pirate Party UK was officially registered on 30 July 2009. In August 2009, it was claimed that Pirate Party UK was undergoing rapid growth similar to one the Swedish Pirate Party had enjoyed in early 2009. It was reported that it had been flooded with enquiries and at its peak around 100 people an hour were signing up to become party members. Donations had been coming in so fast that PayPal was concerned it was a fraudulent site.

On 30 March 2010, the party declared its intent to stand ten candidates across England and Scotland. However, to do so, further party funding would be required. On 27 April 2010, the party announced that it had nine official candidates on the ballot papers, as Mark Sims had missed the deadline because of the air travel disruption after the 2010 Eyjafjallajökull eruption. Following the resignation of first party leader Andrew Robinson, the composer and lecturer Laurence "Loz" Kaye was elected as the new leader on 26 September 2010. In a message sent to members, Kaye stated his key aim as "building the political structure of the party". Previously, Kaye had been the election agent for candidate Tim Dobson who stood for Pirate Party UK in Manchester Gorton.

In the run-up to the 2015 general election, the Pirate Party crowdsourced its manifesto using Reddit. The process ran until 21 March 2015. The Party stood a total of six candidates in the 2015 General Election, including leader Loz Kaye in Manchester Central, who won the largest share of the vote in his constituency with 0.8%.

Following the 2015 general election in May, Kaye stepped down as leader. With the role of deputy leader also being vacant, George Walkden, the party's nominating officer, was approved by the board of governors to serve as an interim leader until the party elected a new leader. Following the leadership election, Cris Chesha was elected leader of the party and David Elston was elected the first deputy leader. Six new governors were elected, with six governors being re-elected. Rebecca Rae was elected to the role of campaigns officer on the NEC. On 18 June, Andrew Norton stepped down as chair of the board, and was replaced by the deputy chair of the board, Andrew Robinson, the leader of the party from 2009 to 2010. On 29 July 2015, Will Tovey was elected as the next deputy chair of the board to replace Robinson. Will Tovey subsequently became chair of the board, and Adrian Farrel replaced him on 14 December 2016. The party's extended period without an elected NEC caught the attention of larger media outlets in October 2016 where Kaye and Elston gave comment.

In June 2017, when the snap general election was called, the Pirate Party UK was under the acting leadership of deputy leader David Elston, the position of party leader being vacant following Chesha's resignation in November 2015. The party launched its manifesto for the 2017 general election on 17 May 2017 in Vauxhall, the home constituency of its lead candidate Mark Chapman, in front of the MI6 building. A crowdfunding campaign, dubbed "Operation Doubloons", was also launched in June to help the party cover the costs of candidate deposits and election materials.

The party subsequently stood ten candidates in the 2017 election, the highest number in the history of the party. These included Elston in Vale of Glamorgan, Chapman in Vauxhall and the party's nominations officer, Jason Winstanley, in Gower. The largest share of the vote was won by Des Hjerling, standing in New Forest West, who received 1% of the vote. Following the election, Elston wrote in a Leader's Update that "Pirates were one of the few parties to make gains" in the election, highlighting the fact that the party had increased its overall share of the vote and more than doubled the number of votes it gained across all candidates compared with the 2015 general election results.

On 29 October 2019, the Pirate Party UK issued a General Election Statement stating that it would not be fielding candidates in the December 2019 general election because of concern that its candidates could split the vote in a "single-issue election" and thus increase the likelihood of the election of candidates whose opinions regarding the UK's future relationship with the EU were incompatible with the those of the PPUK.

In 2020, following a period of stagnation attributed to the challenges of the first-past-the-post voting electoral system (the party declared its support for proportional representation for all elections in the UK in its 2017 manifesto), the focus of political debate on Brexit, and the pressures of the COVID-19 pandemic, the party held a vote on whether or not to disband. The vote to dissolve the party passed with 73% of votes cast in favour of closing down the party. The result of the votes was announced by the party on 7 October 2020 and were as follows:

Organisation

Leadership

Deputy Leadership

Branches
The Pirate Party UK had branches in many places around the United Kingdom. These included London, York, Greater Manchester, Sheffield and Bury.

Pirate Party Wales
Pirate Party Wales was a branch of the Pirate Party UK that covered the entirety of Wales and was founded in 2014 by David Anthony Elston. Pirate Party Wales supported increased recognition of the Welsh language, including reform of the Welsh Language Act 1993 and free Welsh courses for all Welsh nationals. It also supported further devolution to Wales and increased powers for the Welsh Assembly. The only candidate to have stood in Wales for the party was Elston who stood in Bridgend in the 2015 general election.

International affiliation 
On 25 February 2015, the Pirate Party UK announced its withdrawal from its international affiliation, Pirate Party International. This announcement, consolidated by a vote of the board, followed Pirate Party Australia's decision to leave earlier in the same month.

Membership

Election results

It has previously been noted by Robinson, the first Pirate Party UK leader, that the Pirate Party UK's chances of getting a candidate elected to the UK parliament are "pretty much close to zero", because of the first past the post system for electing MPs to Parliament. Instead, its immediate aim is to raise awareness among voters and politicians in the other political parties.

The Pirate Party UK contested its first election in 2010, standing nine candidates in the 2010 general election. The party also stood candidates in the 2011 Oldham East and Saddleworth and 2012 Manchester Central by-elections. The party also contested several local government elections and the 2011 Scottish Parliament election. The party stood six candidates in the 2015 general election, and ten in the 2017 snap general election. In general elections, none of its candidates has ever received more than one percent of the vote.

See also 
 Open Rights Group

References

External links

Official Pirate Party of the United Kingdom website
Official Pirate Party of the United Kingdom 2017 manifesto 
General election 2017: Pirate Party plans for web surveillance. Mark Chapman of the Pirate Party UK on the Daily Politics.

UK
2009 establishments in the United Kingdom
2020 disestablishments in the United Kingdom
Political parties established in 2009
Political parties disestablished in 2020
Defunct political parties in the United Kingdom
Civil liberties advocacy groups
Computer law organizations
Freedom of expression in the United Kingdom
Freedom of expression organizations
Freedom of speech in the United Kingdom
Intellectual property activism
Intellectual property organizations
Internet privacy organizations
Internet-related activism
Politics and technology
Politics of the United Kingdom
Privacy organizations